Jakob Eduard Polak (12 November 1818 – 8 October 1891) was an Austrian physician, born to a Jewish family from Bohemia, who played an important role in introducing modern medicine in Iran.

Life 
Polak studied Medicine in Prague and Vienna. He was one of the six Austrian teachers invited by Amir Kabir, the Persian chief minister, as the instructors of Dar ul-Fonun, the first modern higher education institution in Iran. By his own account, he entered Iran on 24 November 1851, before the inauguration of the Dar ul-Fonun.

From 1851 to 1860, he taught medicine at Dar ul-Fonun. In the beginning, he taught in French and used a translator. Soon, the incompetence of the translators motivated him to learn Persian. He learned Persian in six months, and then taught his course in Persian.

In 1885, he funded Otto Stapf, a Viennese botanist, to undertake a botanical expedition to South- and Western Persia. This led to the discovery of numerous new species of plants.

From 1855 to 1860, he served as personal physician of Naser-al-din Shah. In this capacity he was succeeded by French physician Joseph Désiré Tholozan.

Works 

Polak published his Persian experiences in: "Persien, das Land und seine Bewohner; Ethnograpische Schilderungen" (Leipzig, Brockhaus, 1865), which belongs to the outstanding ethnographic works about 19th-century Iran.

His other works include:
 Bimari i vaba (Tehran: Nast’aliq, 1269 [AH]).
 “La médicine militaire en Perse. Par le docteur J. E. Polak, ancien médecin particulier du schah de Perse,” Revue scientifique et administrative des médecins des armées de terre et de mer 7, 1865
 Topographische Bemerkungen zur Karte der Umgebung und zu dem Plane von Teheran. Mittheilungen der K.K. Geographischen Gesellschaft 20. Wien, L. C. Zamarski, k.k. Hof- Buchdruckereir und Hof-Lithographie 1877.
 Beitrag zu den agrarischen Verhältnissen in Persien. Mittheilungen der K.K. Geographischen Gesellschaft 6, 1863, 107-143.
 "Farben der persischen Teppiche". In: Katalog der Ausstellung orientalischer Teppiche im K.K. Österreichischen Handelsmuseum, Vienna, 1891, 44-49.

See also 
 Dar ul-Funun

Bibliography 
 Afsaneh GÄCHTER: Briefe aus Persien. Jacob E. Polaks medizinische Berichte. With an English Summary and Translation of Polak’s „Letters from Persia“. New Academic Press, Vienna 2013, .
 Christoph WERNER: Polak, Jakob Eduard In: Encyclopædia Iranica. 2009
 Obituary: [[.

References

Further reading 
 Gächter, A. (2015) “Medicine and Anthropology: the ‘Ambassador-Physician’ Jacob Eduard Polak (1818–1891) as a Mediator of Modernity in Iran,” in Krasnowolska, A. and Rusek-Kowalska, R. (eds) Studies on the Iranian World: Medieval and Modern. Jagiellonian University Press, pp. 329–340.

External links 
 
 Encyclopædia Iranica Website. Full-text access to the Encyclopædia as it currently exists.
 

1818 births
1891 deaths
19th-century Austrian physicians
Austrian Jews
Universities in Iran
Austrian expatriates in Iran
Medicine in Iran
People of Qajar Iran